Aidan Ryan (born 4 February 1986) is an Irish sportsperson. He plays hurling with his local club Midleton and has been a member of the Cork senior inter-county team since 2009, when he was called up due to the 2008-2009 Cork players strike. Ryan also played under 21 for Cork during the 2006 and 2007 season

Honours

Midleton
Cork Senior Hurling Championship: 2013

References

1986 births
Living people
Midleton hurlers
Cork inter-county hurlers